The 2nd District of Columbia Infantry was a Union Army infantry regiment that served during the American Civil War.

History
The regiment was recruited in the District of Columbia and mustered into service on February 26, 1862 and assigned to the defenses of Washington, D.C. The unit's first colonel was Isaac A. Peck, who resigned in June 1862 and was succeeded by Charles M. Alexander, who was promoted to colonel at the same time. During the Maryland Campaign it was assigned to the 1st Division, V Corps of the Army of the Potomac; the division was held in reserve during the Battle of Antietam. The regiment then returned to the garrison of Washington in October. During the Battle of Fort Stevens the regiment was held in reserve. Alexander resigned in February 1865 and was replaced by Colonel William Graham. The regiment was mustered out of service on September 12, 1865.

Notable members
Nineteen-year-old Private John Summerfield Staples of Company H, who mustered in on October 1, 1864, served as the "representative recruit" for President Abraham Lincoln.

See also
List of District of Columbia Civil War regiments

References

Sources
 Civil War in the East
 The Civil War Archive

Units and formations of the Union Army from the District of Columbia
1862 establishments in Washington, D.C.
Military units and formations established in 1862
Military units and formations disestablished in 1865